Jacques-Laurent Agasse (April 24, 1767 – December 27, 1849) was an animal and landscape painter from Switzerland.

Born at Geneva, Agasse studied in the public art school of that city. Before he turned twenty he went to Paris to study in veterinary school to make himself fully acquainted with the anatomy of horses and other animals. He seems to have subsequently returned to Switzerland. The Tübinger Morgenblatt (1808, p. 876) says that "Agasse, the celebrated animal painter, now in England, owed his fortune to an accident. About eight years ago, he being then in Switzerland, a rich Englishman (George Pitt, later Lord Rivers) asked him to paint his favourite dog (greyhound) which had died. The Englishman was so pleased with his work that he took the painter to England with him."

Nagler says that he was one of the most celebrated animal painters at the end of the 18th and the beginning of the 19th century. In Johann Georg Meusel's Neue Miscellaneen (viii. 1052 et seq.), he compares Agasse and Wouwermans, wholly in favour of the former. In that partial article much is said of his extreme devotion to art, of his marvelous knowledge of anatomy, of his special fondness for the English racehorses, and his excellence in depicting them. He appears first in the Academy catalogues in 1801 as the exhibitor of the 'Portrait of a Horse', and continued to exhibit more or less until 1845 (contradicting Nagler's statement that he died "about" 1806).

In the catalogues his name is given as J.L. Agasse or Agassé. The number of times Agassé changed his address confirms Redgrave's assertion that "he lived poor and died poor". The writer of the panegyric already quoted says, however, that he did not work for money, but that he was urged forward by the resistless force of natural genius.

Gallery

References
 
 Nagler, Allgemeines Künstler-Lexicon, 1872, gives an account inter alia of his engraved works
 Füssli, Neue Zusätze zu dem allgemeinen Künstler-Lexicon
 Tübinger Morgenblatt, 1808, p. 876
 Meusel, Neue Miscellaneen, viii. 1052
 Fiorillo, Geschichte der Mahlerey, v. 841, speaks of Agasse and Charles Ansell as the most celebrated English animal painters
 Redgrave's Dictionary.

External links

Global Gallery Bio & works
 23 works by Jacques-Laurent Agasse at www.Jacques-Laurent-Agasse.org
 Jacques-Laurent Agasse Paitings Gallery  (Public Domain Paintings - www.art.onilm.com)

1767 births
1849 deaths
Animal artists
Swiss landscape painters
18th-century artists from the Republic of Geneva
Swiss male painters
19th-century Swiss painters
19th-century Swiss male artists